Promontorium Laplace is a raised mountainous cape situated at the end of Montes Jura in Mare Imbrium on the near side of the Moon. Its selenographic coordinates are 46.8° N, 25.5° W and it is 2600 meters high. It forms the northeast boundary of the bay of Sinus Iridum.

It is named after Pierre Simon marquis de Laplace, an 18th-century French astronomer, mathematician, and physicist.

References

External links
 , excellent earth-based image of Sinus Iridum and vicinity, including Promontorium Laplace

Mountains on the Moon